Hordeum marinum, commonly known as sea barley or seaside barley, is a species of grass.

References 

marinum
Flora of the United Kingdom
Plants described in 1778